The Tiruchirappalli Metropolitan Area, or Tiruchirappalli  Urban Agglomeration, is the 51st largest urban agglomeration in India and is the fourth largest metropolitan city in the state of Tamil Nadu next to Chennai, Coimbatore and Madurai. The Tiruchirappalli Metropolitan Area consists of the city of Tiruchirappalli and its suburbs in Tiruchirappalli district.

Municipal corporations 
Tiruchirappalli City Municipal Corporation

Municipalities 
Thuvakudi

Districts 
Tiruchirappalli district (partial)

Taluks 
From Tiruchirapalli district
Manachanallur (partial) 
Srirangam
Tiruchirappalli East
Tiruchirappalli West
Thiruverumbur (partial)
Lalgudi (partial)

Transport
The Regional Transport offices in the Tiruchirappalli metropolitan area are TN-45 (Tiruchirappalli West), TN-48 (Srirangam), TN-81 (Tiruchirappalli East).

See also

 Chennai metropolitan area
 Coimbatore metropolitan area
 Madurai metropolitan area
 List of million-plus urban agglomerations in India
 List of districts in Tamil Nadu by Human Development Index

References

External links
Trichy Urban Area

Metropolitan areas of Tamil Nadu